Cewice  (formerly ) is a village in Lębork County, Pomeranian Voivodeship, in northern Poland. It is the seat of the gmina (administrative district) called Gmina Cewice. It is located within the ethnocultural region of Kashubia in the historic region of Pomerania.

The village has a population of 1,687.

During the German occupation of Poland (World War II), in 1939, the Germans murdered Polish priest, activist and founder of the Polska Żyje Polish resistance organisation, in the village.

References

Cewice